Tom Browne (born 11 November 1945) is a British broadcaster and actor, born in Lymington, Hampshire, and educated at King's College School, Wimbledon.

Career

Early film and acting career
As an actor, Browne graduated from RADA. He has appeared in many films, including Prudence and the Pill, Decline and Fall and The Vampire Lovers. He has also performed throughout the UK in repertory theatres and in plays for both the BBC and ITV.  He starred with Richard Todd in "The Winslow Boy" (1971) and then in "A Christmas Carol" also with Todd and Mervyn Johns.

Television
He appeared very briefly in the fourth series of the television series The Flaxton Boys set in 1945 (the earlier series being set in 1854, 1890 and 1928) playing the part of Captain Ewing in the episode called, "Is Your Journey Really Necessary?" shown on television on 25 March 1973.  He has also made appearances in the 1968 TV series Virgin of the Secret Service, The Queen Street Gang, The Prior Commitment, the 1971 TV series Hine, Budgie, and Whodunnit?.  However, he is probably better known for his part as the Headmaster, James Bonfils, in Emmerdale Farm from November, 1974 through to April, 1975.

Early radio broadcasting and BBC Radio 1 career
He began his radio broadcasting career in Denmark in 1965. He married a Danish girl and moved to Chiswick in west London and in 1972 was unexpectedly chosen by BBC producer Johnny Beerling to succeed Alan Freeman as presenter of the BBC Radio 1 Sunday afternoon chart show. He presented this show from 1 October 1972 to 26 March 1978.  Initially the show ran for 3 hours from 4 p.m. to 7 p.m. each Sunday called "Solid Gold Sixty", the first two hours being devoted to new releases and climbers on that week's Radio One playlist.  "Solid Gold Sixty" ran from October 1972 to March 1974.  Bernie Andrews was the producer of these chart shows and Pete Ritzema worked as engineer.

The first record that Tom Browne played on "Solid Gold 60" at 4.00 pm on Sunday 1 October 1972 was Honky Cat by Elton John. The first two hours were broadcast only on Radio 1's medium wave channel, which at that time was 247 metres (1215 kHz) although occasionally local radio stations broadcasting on FM in mono such as BBC Radio London (94.9 MHz) would carry the transmission from 4 - 6pm. The previous Sunday chart show, the long running Pick of the Pops with Alan Freeman, aired between 5-7 pm and was broadcast not just on 247m but Radio 2's FM and LW frequencies for the entire show, but the axing of Pick of the Pops, brought a change to the allocation of FM and LW airtime, with Radio 1 losing one of the precious hours of valuable FM and LW for its chart show, as they reverted to Radio 2. This was bad news for the numerous parts of the country where reception of Radio 1 on 247m was poor, especially during the dark winter months when AM reception deteriorated. From the outset on 1 October 1972, Solid Gold 60's final hour was broadcast on FM and LW as well as on Radio 1 (247m). Twenty records were crammed into 60 minutes, plus a verbal countdown. Whilst many recordings of the many Top 20s aired between 6-7 survive today, there seem to be few recordings of the first two hours of Solid Gold 60 (4-6pm) which have survived.  The music used for the introduction of the Top 20 broadcast from 6pm to 7pm on BBC Radio 1, also using BBC Radio 2's FM transmitters on 88-91 MHz, was Brother by the band CCS.

At 7.00 p.m., the VHF/FM (88 – 91 MHz) transmitters reverted to BBC Radio 2 only. The programme was listened to by millions and started with the sound of the Apollo mission's 'we have lift-off!' words.  Sound effects, amongst many, included a racing car which indicated a record was rapidly moving up the top 20. Each chart position from 20 to number 1 had an individually numbered sung jingle provided by Pams Productions of Dallas, Texas which was played prior to each record. This group also created the jingle 'It's A Top Twenty Entry - Right!' which was used regularly on the programme, and indicated that the record was already in the BBC Top 30 the week before. After the number 2 hit had finished playing, a further vocal run-down by Browne of numbers 20 down to 2 followed (with Browne's choice of background music) and then the number one record was announced and played which completed the programme. The chart was first broadcast (compiled by the British Market Research Bureau) on Johnnie Walker's programme the previous Tuesday (247 metres MW only) and played by Walker at that time. The music used for that rundown was Booker T. & the M.G.'s track, "Time is Tight".  A further "sound effect" which may have been forgotten by many is the one used during the first two hours of the show to denote a record that was thought to be about to enter the top 20 which had the sound of a bubbling hot mixture with a vocal saying "This ones bubbling under" !   A sung jingle was also included in the first two hours for new releases which went.."Its a new one, a new one...repeated".

The Sunday chart show would be the only show Browne ever presented on Radio 1, but he did present occasional music documentaries on the station, notably on ABBA, Queen and The Stylistics, and he never showed any sign of crossing over  permanently to television (except for his appearances mentioned earlier), for example via Top of the Pops. His smooth style and received pronunciation James Mason-like voice (becoming more noticeable in later years; initially he had tried to sound more like a 1970s pop radio DJ) were unusual for Radio 1 even then, and would be utterly unthinkable now.

Later broadcasting career
After leaving Radio 1 he broadcast for BBC Radio 2 in the early 1980s and provided the voiceover for many TV and radio adverts. He subsequently became a newsreader for BBC World television and then moved to Hong Kong, where he became a popular broadcaster on the British Armed Forces radio service in the final years of British rule. His final appearance as a DJ on national BBC radio came at the very end of 1991, when he presented "The Million Selling Singles of the 60s and 70s" on BBC Radio 2, although he was a contributor to Radio 1's "25 Years of the UK Top 40", which aired in September 1992.  He fronted BFBS Radio Hong Kong's weekday breakfast show until the territory reverted to Chinese rule in 1997 and continued working in radio, as well as a commercial voice-over artist and freelance video presenter until 2005. In 2003 he recorded linking vocals for Shaun Tilley's UK Rewind Top Twenty Show.

Retirement
Browne moved to Thailand to retire with his Thai wife where he owns a farm where they grow mushrooms and rice.

References

1945 births
Alumni of RADA
English male voice actors
English radio DJs
BBC Radio 1 presenters
Living people
People educated at King's College School, London
People from Lymington